Paula-Claudia Ungureanu (née Rădulescu; born 30 March 1980) is a Romanian handballer who plays for Rapid București. She retired from the Romania national team in 2016. 

Ungureanu successfully replaced Luminița Dinu after her retirement. Shortly after taking these positions she became known for a high percentage of saves in games and for managing difficult saves in key points of games. Paula Ungureanu ranked fourth on the Top Goalkeepers list of the 2009 World Women's Handball Championship with a 41% save rate. In the 2014 European Championship, she ranked second after Silje Solberg on the Top Goalkeepers list with a 40% save rate.

Honours

Clubs
Austrian Championship:
Champion: 2005, 2006
Austrian Cup:
Winner: 2005, 2006
Hungarian Championship
Runner-up: 2008
Hungarian Cup
Finalist: 2008
Croatian Championship
Champion: 2009
Croatian Cup: 
Winner: 2009
Romanian Championship
Champion: 2010, 2011, 2012, 2013, 2014, 2017
Romanian Cup
Winner: 2011, 2014, 2015
Romanian Supercup
Winner: 2014, 2015
Finalist: 2018
Champions League:
Silver Medalist: 2010
Bronze Medalist: 2017, 2018

National team 
World Championship:
Silver Medalist: 2005
Bronze Medalist: 2015
European Championship:
Bronze Medalist: 2010

Individual awards
 Carpathian Trophy Best Goalkeeper: 2010, 2012
 Romanian Handballer of the Year: 2012, 2014
 Memoriálu Tomáša Jakubču Best Goalkeeper: 2013
 Team of the Tournament Goalkeeper of the Trofeul Maramureș: 2013
 Baia Mare Champions Trophy Best Goalkeeper: 2014
 Team of the Tournament Goalkeeper of the Baia Mare Champions Trophy: 2014
 Handball-Planet.com Best Goalkeeper: 2015
 Romanian Liga Națională Best Romanian Player: 2015, 2016
 Prosport All-Star Goalkeeper of the Romanian Liga Națională: 2017

References

 

1980 births
Sportspeople from Brașov
Living people
Romanian female handball players
Expatriate handball players
Romanian expatriate sportspeople in Austria
Romanian expatriate sportspeople in Croatia
Romanian expatriate sportspeople in Hungary
SCM Râmnicu Vâlcea (handball) players
CS Minaur Baia Mare (women's handball) players
Handball players at the 2016 Summer Olympics
Olympic handball players of Romania
RK Podravka Koprivnica players